The Dudes, also sometimes stylized simply as Dudes, were a Canadian pop rock band active in the 1970s. They were originally called "All The Young Dudes".

History
The Dudes were formed in Montreal, Quebec in 1974 by Bill Trochim and Bob Segarini after the breakup of their former band, the Wackers. The other founding members of the Dudes were drummers Ritchie Henman and Wayne Cullen, and guitarists David Henman and Brian Greenway. Their debut album, We're No Angels, was released on CBS Records International and Columbia Records in 1975. It produced the hit single "I Just Wanna Dance". The album was recorded in Le Studio in Morin Heights, Quebec, and was produced by Mark Spector. The band itself was unhappy with how the album's music turned out. They subsequently toured across North America, opening for Savoy Brown and the Bee Gees. The band's members subsequently stopped focusing on making music together, and each became involved in individual projects instead. As David Henman later noted, "Oddly enough, The Dudes never officially broke up, to the best of my recollection...The whole affair just slowly fizzled out and we gradually got involved in other stuff. There was no point when we actually called it quits. We will always be the band that never broke up."

Discography
We're No Angels (CBS/Columbia, 1975)
All the Young Dudes, All the Old Demos (Pacemaker, 1997)

References

1974 establishments in Quebec
Musical groups established in 1974
English-language musical groups from Quebec
CBS Records artists
Columbia Records artists
Musical groups disestablished in the 1970s
Canadian pop rock music groups
1970s disestablishments in Quebec